Kazimiera Utrata (5 July 1932 – 12 August 2018) was a Polish actress. She appeared in 49 films and television shows from 1959 to 2018.

Selected filmography
 A Woman's Decision (1975)
 Ballada o Januszku (1988)

References

External links

1932 births
2018 deaths
People from Warsaw
Polish film actresses
Polish television actresses
20th-century Polish actresses
21st-century Polish actresses